Sophia Shaningwa (born 13 May 1959 in Outapi, Namibia) is a Namibian politician, currently serving as Secretary General of the SWAPO party of Namibia. She previously served as Minister for Urban and Rural Development from 21 March 2015 to February 2018 in President Hage Geingob's administration.  when she was the minister of Urban and Rural  Development her ministry was awarded a cheque by Samlam to eliminate the bucket toilet system, because sanitation and hygience is believed to be a major challenge in the rural areas.  In 2017 Shaningwa was elected the Secretary-General of the Swapo Party. Shaningwa retained her position of the secretary general last year 30 November 2022 defeating  Oshikoto Regional Councilor Armas Amukwiyu.

Education 
Shaningwa left Namibia for exile in May 1980  and underwent military training as a People's Liberation Army of Namibia (PLAN) combatant. She studied at Ivanova Teachers Training College in the Soviet Union.

Political Carrer 
Shaningwa was appointed Governor of Khomas Region in 2004. She later served as Governor of Omusati Region. In 2014, she was elected to the National Assembly. She had previously worked at the National Housing Enterprise and served as Windhoek West councillor.

Awards 
Shaningwa was conferred the Most Distinguished Order of Namibia: First Class on Heroes' Day 2014.

References

Living people
SWAPO politicians
People's Liberation Army of Namibia personnel
Governors of Khomas Region
Members of the National Assembly (Namibia)
Government ministers of Namibia
Women government ministers of Namibia
Women regional governors of Namibia
Women members of the National Assembly (Namibia)
1959 births
21st-century Namibian women politicians
21st-century Namibian politicians